Marty A. Bergen (born April 21, 1948) is an American bridge teacher, writer and player. A ten-time national champion and American Contract Bridge League Grand Life Master, he retired from active competition in 1993. He is still a bridge teacher and writer and is a World Bridge Federation World International Master. He was recently voted to be the 22nd most influential person in the history of bridge.

Bergen has been a columnist in the monthly ACBL Bridge Bulletin since 1976. He has also written a total of 69 bridge books and booklets from 1995 to 2018 Two of his books won the ABTA Bridge Book of the Year award, Points Schmoints!: Bergen's Winning Bridge Secrets in 1996 and Declarer Play the Bergen Way in 2005.

Bergen is known for his development of many new conventions and treatments. His most popular ones are DONT, Bergen raises, 1NT semi-forcing and The Rule of 20. He and Larry Cohen were one of the most successful pairs in the 1980s, and they later were instrumental in educating players about THE Law of Total Tricks.

Bergen is married to Cheryl Bergen née Lance and they reside in Palm Beach Gardens, Florida.

Bridge accomplishments

Awards
 Herman Trophy 1983
 American Bridge Teachers' Association Book of the Year 1996, 2005
 Elected to Bridge Hall of Fame in 2022

Wins
 North American Bridge Championships (10)
 Spingold (1) 1984
 Reisinger (2) 1985, 1991
 Men's Board-a-Match Teams (2) 1981, 1984
 Blue Ribbon Pairs (2) 1983, 1988
 Life Master Pairs (1) 1988
 Life Master Men's Pairs (1) 1983
 Men's Pairs (1) 1983
 Other notable wins:
 Pan-American Maccabi Games (1) 1983
 Cavendish Invitational Teams (1) 1988
 Cavendish Invitational Pairs (2) 1984, 1989
 Goldman Pairs (1) 1983

Runners-up
 North American Bridge Championships (10)
 Vanderbilt (2) 1982, 1990
 Spingold (1) 1983
 Grand National Teams (2) 1979, 1991
 Open Board-a-Match Teams (1) 1990
 Master Mixed Teams (2) 1989, 1991
 Life Master Men's Pairs (1) 1986
 Grand National Pairs (1) 1984
 United States Bridge Championships (1)
 Open Team Trials (1) 1985
 Other notable 2nd places:
 Cavendish Invitational Teams (1) 1986

References

External links
 

 

1948 births
American contract bridge players
Contract bridge writers
People from Farmingdale, New York
Living people
Place of birth missing (living people)